Lizzi Holzschuh (1908–1979) was an Austrian singer and actress.

Selected filmography
 Our Emperor (1933)
 The Cousin from Nowhere (1934)
 The Gentleman Without a Residence (1934)
 Heaven on Earth (1935)
 The Charm of La Boheme (1937)
 Escape to the Adriatic (1937)
 Falstaff in Vienna (1940)
 Viennese Girls (1945)
 Candidates for Marriage (1958)

References

Bibliography
 Goble, Alan. The Complete Index to Literary Sources in Film. Walter de Gruyter, 1999.

External links

1908 births
1979 deaths
Austrian film actresses
20th-century Austrian women singers
Actresses from Vienna